The Brit Award for British Video of the Year was an award given by the British Phonographic Industry (BPI), an organisation which represents record companies and artists in the United Kingdom. The accolade is presented at the Brit Awards, an annual celebration of British and international music. The nominees are determined by the Brit Awards voting academy with over one-thousand members, which comprise record labels, publishers, managers, agents, media, and previous winners and nominees.

History
The award was first presented in 1985 as British Video of the Year. From 2003 to 2013, the award was not given out. It was then revived in 2014, becoming a fan-voted award which allows users of Twitter to vote for nominees through personalised hashtags. The vote involves weekly fan votes through Twitter, including the final vote which takes place on the night of the ceremony. The award was defunct following the 2019 Brit Awards and was last awarded to Little Mix.

Winners and nominees

1980s

1990s

2000s

2010s

Artists with multiple wins

Artists with multiple nominations
6 nominations

 Calvin Harris
 Robbie Williams

5 nominations
 Jamiroquai

4 nominations

 Blur
 Little Mix
 George Michael
 One Direction
 Seal
 Simply Red

3 nominations

 All Saints
 Anne-Marie
 Jonas Blue
 David Bowie
 The Chemical Brothers
 Clean Bandit
 Coldplay
 The Cure
 Peter Gabriel
 Ellie Goulding
 Dua Lipa
 Rita Ora
 Ed Sheeran
 Sam Smith
 Spice Girls
 Lisa Stansfield
 Supergrass

2 nominations

 Adele
 The Beautiful South
 Depeche Mode
 Erasure
 Fatboy Slim
 Noel Gallagher
 Jess Glynne
 Jax Jones
 Zara Larsson
 Massive Attack
 Naughty Boy
 Oasis
 Liam Payne
 The Prodigy
 Radiohead
 The Rolling Stone
 Shakespears Sister
 Suede
 Take That
 Travis
 Wham!
 Zayn

Notes
 "Killer" (1991–1992) Double Nominated
 "Pray" (1994), "Parklife" (1995), "Never Ever" (1998), "She's the One" (2000), "Rock DJ" (2001) also won Brit Award for British Single

References

Brit Awards
Music video awards
Awards established in 1985
Awards established in 2014
Awards disestablished in 2002
Awards disestablished in 2019